The Kam–Sui peoples are a group of related ethnic groups in China and neighboring portions of Northern Laos and Vietnam. They are defined as speakers of Kam–Sui languages, which belong linguistically to the Kra–Dai languages.

Kam–Sui of China

Bouyei of Guizhou Province (including Ai-Cham, Mak and T'en, although most Bouyei are nuclear Tai)
Dong of Guizhou, Hunan and Guangxi Provinces (also referred to as the Kam people)
Mulao of Guizhou Province
Maonan of Guangxi Province
Sui of Guizhou, Yunnan and Guangxi Provinces (also spelled "Shui")

Cao Miao people
The Cao Miao people of Guizhou, Hunan and Guangxi Provinces speak a Kam-Sui language called Mjiuniang, although it is believed that the people are of Hmong–Mien descent.

Biao people
Whether or not the Biao people of China are of Kam-Sui descent is an issue of present debate in the scientific community. They are, however, a Tai ethnic group.

Kang people
The Kang people of Yunnan Province (referred to as Tai Khang in Laos) speak a Kam–Sui language, but ethnically descend from the Dai people.

Kam–Sui of Vietnam
The following Kam–Sui ethnic groups originating in China have population clusters in Vietnam:
Dong (also referred to as the Kam people)
Sui (also referred to as the Shui people in China)

Tai Khang people of Laos

The Tai Khang people of Laos (referred to as Kang in China) speak a Kam–Sui language, but ethnically descend from the Dai people.

References

Ethnic groups in China
Ethnic groups in Vietnam
Ethnic groups in Laos